District 2 of the Georgia Senate is a senatorial district that encompasses parts of Southeast Georgia encompassing most of the city of Savannah.  The current senator is Lester G. Jackson.

District officeholders

Notes

References

External links
 Senate District 2 at Georgia Senate

Government of Georgia (U.S. state)
Georgia Senate districts